Glengormley Integrated High School is a secondary school in the town of Newtownabbey in County Antrim, Northern Ireland. It was opened in September 1971.

It is a non-selective school accepting children from all academic backgrounds.  The school is situated approximately 15 minutes from Belfast City in a large suburb of Belfast. The grounds are extensive with three main teaching buildings, gardens, greenhouse, tennis and basketball courts, running track, rugby and football pitches. A new sixth form centre has been added and also an indoor gym and sports hall.

The school received specialist status as an ICT Academy. It has close links with local primary schools and encourages pupils to volunteer within the community via the Duke of Edinburgh Scheme.

Athletics
The school has a number of sports clubs including hockey, football and netball, A dance squad has been established.  A number of ex-students have gone on to achieve sporting success including playing for Manchester United Football Club and representing Northern Ireland Under 21 netball.

Notable former pupils
 Craig Cathcart former Manchester Utd player, now Watford and Northern Ireland international
 Andrew Mitchell (footballer, born 1992) played for Rangers FC went on to make his first team debut on 17 March 2012 
 Jeremy McWilliams, motorcycle ace
 Neil Sinclair, boxer  
 Chris Patterson current WRC co-driver/navigator for Petter Solberg 
 Carl Frampton Professional boxer

External links
 

Secondary schools in County Antrim

Specialist colleges in Northern Ireland